Jordyn Adams (born October 18, 1999) is an American professional baseball outfielder  in the Los Angeles Angels organization.

Amateur career
Adams attended Blythewood High School in Blythewood, South Carolina and transferred to Green Hope High School in Cary, North Carolina for his senior year. He played both baseball and American football. In July 2017, he played in the Under Armour All-America Baseball Game and hit a walk-off single in the bottom of the 11th inning to give his team the victory. As a senior in football, he had 54 receptions for 1,060 yards and 16 touchdowns. He played in the U.S. Army All-American Bowl. He was also invited to play at the Under Armour All-America Game. Adams committed to the University of North Carolina to play both college football and college baseball. He was rated by Rivals.com as a four-star football recruit and ranked among the top players in his class. He was also considered a top prospect for the 2018 Major League Baseball draft.

Professional career
Adams was selected 17th overall by the Los Angeles Angels in the draft. He decided against playing college football and signed with the Angels for $3,472,900. He made his professional debut with the Arizona League Angels and was promoted to the Orem Owlz in August. His season was ended in late August after suffering a broken jaw that occurred during an outfield collision. In 29 games between the Angels and Owls, Adams batted .267 with 13 RBIs.

Adams spent a majority of the 2019 season with the Burlington Bees, and also played in three games in the Arizona League and nine games with the Inland Empire 66ers. Over 109 games between the three clubs, Adams slashed .257/.351/.369 with eight home runs, 36 RBIs, and 16 stolen bases. After not playing a game in 2020 due to the cancellation of the minor season caused by the COVID-19 pandemic, Adams began 2021 with the Tri-City Dust Devils. Over 71 games, he batted .217 with five home runs, 27 RBIs, and 18 stolen bases. He returned to Tri-City to open the 2022 season.

On June 29th, Adams got called up from High-A Tri-City, to the Double-A Rocket City Trash Pandas

Personal
His father, Deke Adams, was most recently the defensive line coach for the University of Mississippi football team.

References

External links

1999 births
Living people
People from Blythewood, South Carolina
Baseball players from South Carolina
Baseball players from North Carolina
Baseball outfielders
Arizona League Angels players
Orem Owlz players
Burlington Bees players
Inland Empire 66ers of San Bernardino players